Charaxes nyikensis, the montane charaxes, is a butterfly in the family Nymphalidae. It is found in Malawi and eastern Zambia. 

The habitat consists of montane forests, riverine forests, scrub forests and Brachystegia woodland (Miombo).

The larvae feed on Albizia gummifera and Dalbergia lactea.

Taxonomy
Charaxes nyikensis is a member of the large species group Charaxes etheocles.

References
Van Someren, V.G. L., 1966 Revisional notes on African Charaxes (Lepidoptera: Nymphalidae). Part III. Bulletin of the British Museum (Natural History) (Entomology)45-101. 85
Van Someren, V.G. L., 1975 Revisional notes on African Charaxes, Palla and Euxanthe (Lepidoptera: Nymphalidae). Part X. Bulletin of the British Museum of Natural History (Entomology) 32 (3):65-136. Status revised to full species.

External links
Charaxes nyikensis images at Consortium for the Barcode of Life

Butterflies described in 1975
nyikensis